The 2016 Mid-American Conference baseball tournament was held May 25–29.  The top eight regular season finishers of the conference's 11 teams, regardless of division, met in the double-elimination tournament held at All Pro Freight Stadium in Avon, Ohio.  The seventh-seeded Western Michigan Broncos won the tournament to earn the conference's automatic bid to the 2016 NCAA Division I baseball tournament. It marked the first championship game appearance and tournament title for the Broncos.

Seeding and format
The winners of each division claim the top two seeds, with the remaining six spots in the field determined by conference winning percentage, regardless of division.  Teams then play a two bracket, double-elimination tournament to determine the final two teams. When two teams remain, if both teams are undefeated or have one loss, there is a one-game final. If one team has a loss and the other team is undefeated, the team with one loss must win twice.

Results

References

Tournament
Mid-American Conference baseball tournament
Mid-American Conference baseball tournament
Mid-American Conference Baseball Tournament